José Bustamante (born 1907, date of death unknown) was a Bolivian footballer who played as a forward for Club Litoral of La Paz.

Career 
During his career who made two appearances for the Bolivia national team at the 1930 FIFA World Cup.

References

External links

 

1907 births
Year of death missing
Footballers from La Paz
Association football forwards
Bolivian footballers
Bolivia international footballers
1930 FIFA World Cup players
Club Deportivo Litoral (La Paz) players